Almeirim Airport  is the airport serving Almeirim, located in the Pará state of Brazil.

Airlines and destinations

Access

See also

List of airports in Brazil

References

External links

Airports in Pará